A raiyah or reaya  (from  , a plural of   "countryman, animal, sheep pasturing, subjects, nationals, flock", also spelled raiya, raja, raiah, re'aya; Ottoman Turkish رعايا ; Modern Turkish râiya  or reaya; related to the Arabic word rā'ī راعي which means "shepherd, herdsman, patron") was a member of the tax-paying lower class of Ottoman society, in contrast to the askeri and kul. The raiyah made up over 90% of the general population in the millet communities. In the Muslim world, raiyah is literally subject of a government or sovereign. The raiyah (literally 'members of the flock') included Christians, Muslims, and Jews who were 'shorn' (i.e. taxed) to support the state and the associated 'professional Ottoman' class.

However, both in contemporaneous and in modern usage, it refers to non-Muslim subjects in particular, also called zimmi.

In the early Ottoman Empire, raiyah were not eligible for military service, but from the late 16th century, Muslim raiyah became eligible, to the distress of some of the ruling class.

See also
Dhimmi
Giaour
Ottoman Millet system
Second-class citizen
Qara bodun

References

Sources
 Molly Greene, A Shared World: Christians and Muslims in the Early Modern Mediterranean, Princeton, 2000. 
 Peter F. Sugar, Southeastern Europe under Ottoman Rule, 1354-1804, series title A History of East Central Europe, volume V, University of Washington Press, 1983.  .

Social classes in the Ottoman Empire
Taxation in the Ottoman Empire